The Taifa of Seville ( Ta'ifat-u Ishbiliyyah) was an Arab kingdom which was ruled by the Abbadid dynasty. It was established in 1023 and lasted until 1091, in what is today southern Spain and Portugal. It gained independence from the Caliphate of Cordoba and it expanded the territory it ruled in the mid-11th century. The emerging power of Castile led Seville to ask military assistance from the Almoravids, who then occupied Seville.

History
The taifa (principality) began as a small, weakly-defended territory comprising parts of the modern Spanish provinces of Seville, Huelva, and Cádiz, but quickly emerged as the most powerful taifa of the time, after its rulers began a policy of expansion.

The first emir of Seville was Abu al-Qasim (1023–1042). He was qadi of Seville and declared independence from the Caliphate of Córdoba after its downfall in 1031, becoming Abbad I, emir of Seville. His son, Abbad II al-Mu'tadid (1042–1069) who succeeded him, expanded the taifa by conquering Mertola, Niebla, Saltés and Huelva, Silves, Santa María de Algarve during his reign.

His son, Muhammad al-Mu'tamid (1069–1091), turned Seville into a major centre of Ibero-Muslim culture. He seized Córdoba in 1071, and maintained a precarious hold on the city until 1091 (with a brief interlude in 1075–1078). While his vizier and fellow poet Ibn Ammar, conquered Murcia.

Nevertheless, the Abbad dynasty felt insecure from Castile's military successes in Aragon, Valencia, and especially from the fall of Toledo in 1085 under the leadership of King Alfonso VI. Al-Mu'tamid requested assistance from the Almoravids, a dynasty from present-day Morocco, to fight against the Castilians. The Almoravids established themselves at Algeciras, and after defeating the Christians at the Battle of Sagrajas in 1086, occupied the other Muslim taifas, including Seville itself in 1091. Following this, the Almoravids would go on to occupy and control vast swathes of present-day Spain. After they ravaged the city, al-Mu'tamid ordered his sons to surrender the royal fortress (the location of the present-day Alcázar of Seville) in order to save their lives. He was taken prisoner to Aghmat, where he was executed in 1095.

Besides the intrigues and the eagerness for conquests of the kings, many artists of the time moved to the court of Seville, as the Almería poet Ibn al-Abbâr and Abû 'Âmir ibn Maslama had done. Abû'l-Walîd al-Himyarî made a compilation of literary works of both of them.

Culture 
The city used to produce a variety of lusterware from the latter half of the 11th century. Several pieces of lusterware was found from the Ebro valley which indicated decorations found similar to ceramics made in the Taifa of Seville. These ceramics bear inscriptions to two Abbadid princes of Seville, who are identified by their proper names and titles. These production centers were operated under the authority of the Abbadid princes over several decades during the late 11th century.

Symbols

Chronicles mention of a time where the Almoravids fought under a white flag, while Andalusian soldiers like Emir Al-Mu'tamid fought under different green flags with Islamic texts written on them. This is supposedly the origin of the current Andalusian flag, currently used as the autonomous region flag, called Arbonaida.

See also
 Al-Andalus
 History of Islam
 History of Spain
 List of Sunni Muslim dynasties

References

External links

 Brief history of Seville
 War upon Iberia

 
11th century in Al-Andalus
States and territories established in 1023
1023 establishments in Europe
States and territories disestablished in 1091
1091 disestablishments in Europe
Seville